Thomas Muster was the defending champion, but did not participate this year.

Àlex Corretja won the tournament, beating Francisco Clavet in the final, 6–3, 7–5.

Seeds

Draw

Finals

Top half

Bottom half

External links
 Main draw

Portugal Open
1997 ATP Tour
Estoril Open